Cleopatra of Jerusalem was a woman who lived in the 1st century BC during the Roman Empire. She was the fifth wife of King of Judea Herod the Great.

Biography 
There is a possibility that Cleopatra could have been a daughter of a local noble from Jerusalem. She was born and raised in the city and could have been of Jewish or Edomite-Phoenician origins. Cleopatra was called Cleopatra of Jerusalem, to distinguish her from the Ptolemaic Greek Queen Cleopatra VII of Egypt.

Josephus mentions "Cleopatra of Jerusalem" twice: once in his Antiquities of the Jews 17.1.3 and once in his The Jewish War 1.28.4. Cleopatra of Jerusalem was not related to the Hasmonaean Dynasty. She had married King Herod the Great in 25 BC. Herod possibly married her as a part of a political alliance.

Cleopatra had two sons with Herod who were:
 Herod (b. 24 BC/23 BC), of which very little is known. 
 Herod Philip II (b. 22 BC/21 BC – 34) who later became the Tetrarch of Ituraea and Trachonitis.

Cleopatra's children by Herod were raised and educated in Rome. After the death of her husband in 4 BC, her second son inherited some of his father's dominion and ruled as a Roman client king until his death in 34. Cleopatra became the mother-in-law of Philip's wife and niece Salome. Philip and Salome had no children.

See also
 Cleopatra

References

Sources
Josephus: Antiquities of the Jews 17.1.3
Josephus: The Jewish War 1.28.4
http://virtualreligion.net/iho/herod2.html
http://www.historyofthedaughters.com/69.pdf
https://www.livius.org/he-hg/herodians/herod_the_great02.html

Herodian dynasty
Ancient Jewish women
1st-century BC women
Ancient queens consort